The Royal Flying Doctor Service or RFDS, was an Australian television series on the Nine Network based on the work of the Royal Flying Doctor Service of Australia.

Overview
The series follows the daily working lives of RFDS personnel in Broken Hill and Dubbo, documenting their operations as they respond to emergencies.

Broadcast history
The first two episodes of the program were broadcast on 24 September and 1 October 2007 before being pulled from the schedule. Nine then scheduled the remainder of the series at 7:00 Sunday from 16 March 2008.

Ratings

See also
 Royal Flying Doctor Service
 RFDS
 The Flying Doctors

References & External links
 http://www.thewest.com.au/default.aspx?MenuID=24&ContentID=41790
 http://www.flyingdoctor.net/
 http://channelnine.ninemsn.com.au/section.aspx?sectionid=6024&sectionname=rfds

Australian factual television series
Australian medical television series
Documentary television series about aviation
Nine Network original programming
Television series by ITV Studios
Television shows set in New South Wales
2007 Australian television series debuts
2007 Australian television series endings